Asparagus virus 2 is a plant pathogenic virus of the family Bromoviridae.

References

External links
 ICTVdB - The Universal Virus Database: Asparagus virus 2
 Family Groups - The Baltimore Method

Bromoviridae
Viral plant pathogens and diseases